The 2019 Allerdale Borough Council election took place on 2 May 2019, to elect all 49 members of Allerdale Borough Council in Cumbria, United Kingdom. The number of councillors had been reduced from 56 at the previous election, meaning several seats were combined. Four seats were uncontested, all of which were won by members of the Conservative Party. The result was a change in administration of the council, from a Labour Party minority to a coalition of Conservatives and independents. However, the council technically remains in No Overall Control.

Summary

Election result

|-

Results shown above are compared to the results of the previous election in 2015 and may not take into account by-elections, crossing the floor, and other changes. UKIP lost 3 seats compared to 2015, but did not stand any candidates so is not shown in the results table.

Ward results

All Saints

Allhallows & Waverton

Aspatria

Boltons

Broughton St. Bridgets

Christchurch

Crummock and Derwent Valley

Dalton

Ellen & Gilcrux

Flimby

Harrington & Salterbeck

Keswick

Marsh & Wampool

Maryport North

Maryport South

Moorclose & Moss Bay

Seaton & Northside

Silloth & Solway Coast

St. John's

St. Michael's

Stainburn & Clifton

Warnell

Wigton & Woodside

By-elections

Aspatria

Christchurch

Ellen and Gilcrux

St. John's

Seaton and Northside

Maryport South

Stainburn & Clifton

References

Allerdale Borough Council elections
Allerdale Borough Council election
Allerdale Borough Council election
2010s in Cumbria